Bid Shirin or Bid-e Shirin may refer to:
 Bid-e Shirin, Jiroft
 Bid-e Shirin, Kerman
 Bid-e Shirin-e Do